Marija Šerifović (born 14 November 1984) is a Serbian singer. Born in Kragujevac, she is arguably best known for winning the Eurovision Song Contest 2007 in Helsinki, Finland with "Molitva", becoming Serbia's first and to date only winning entry.

Šerifović made her recording debut in 1998 and has released five studio albums as well as numerous standalone singles. Additionally, she has served as a judge on the televised singing competition Zvezde Granda since 2015. She has won the Artistic Marcel Bezençon Award for "Molitva" and two regional MAC Awards. Predominately recognized for balladic songs, Šerifović is often regarded as one of the best female pop vocalists in Serbia.

Early life
Šerifović was born on November 14, 1984 in Kragujevac. She is the only child to musicians Verica and Rajko Šerifović. According to the column by The Guardian'''s Germaine Greer, she is of Romani descent and has been out as a lesbian since 2004. Šerifović graduated from the First Grammar School in Kragujevac.

In 1998, she made her recording debut with a television performance of the song "Moje bube", which she recorded with her mother.

Career
2003-2006: Career beginnings, Naj, Najbolja and Bez ljubavi
Her debut album Naj, Najbolja was released under City Records in 2003. The following year, Šerifović participated at the Pjesma Mediterana music festival in Budva with the song "Bol do ludila", winning the frist prize. In 2006, she released her second album Bez Ljubavi, which was a year later promoted with her first solo concert at Sava Centar in Belgrade.

2007-2010: Eurovision Song Contest, Nisam anđeo and Anđeo
In March 2007, Šerifović competed at the Serbian national selection festival for the 2007 Eurovision Song Contest in Helsinki, Finland, called Beovizija, with the song "Molitva". On the final on March 8, she was declared the winner by receiving most televotes and coming second on the jury's vote, and thus became the first Eurovision  representative of Serbia since the country restored its independence as a sovereign state in 2006. At the Eurovision, Šerifović performed 15th during the semi-final on May 10, placing first with 298 points. Subsequently, at the grand final on May 17, she sang 17th. Her performance of "Molitva" scored the maximum of 268 pints and was declared the winner of the 52nd Eurovision. Upon returning home, Šerifović was greeted by reportedly 70,000 people in front of the House of the City Assembly of Belgrade. 

In 2008, she released her third studio album Nisam anđeo, which circulated in 120,000 copies. A year later, it was followed by Anđeo, which was sold in 100,000 units. Same year, Šerifović announced a solo concert at the Belgrade Arena for 11 May 2009. In 2010, she participated on the second season of the reality television show Farma, which she voluntarily left after 27 days.

2011-2020: Hrabro, standalone singles and Zvezde Granda
Šerifović was given a documentary film, titled Ispovest (Confession), in which she reflected on her sexual orientation as well as on personal struggles, such as domestic abuse from her father. The movie premiered at Sava Centar in November 2013. The following year, she also released an autobiography of the same name. In May 2014, Šerifović released her fifth album Hrabro. It was sold in 50,000 copies.

In September 2015, she became a judge on the singing competition Zvezde Granda. As a mentor on the show, she had the winning contestant for two consecutive seasons with Džejla Ramović in 2019 and Mahir Mulalić in 2021. Between 2015 and 2016, she released a series of three songs: "Pametna i luda", "Sama i nervozna" and "Svoja i tvoja". In March 2016, Šerifović held a concert at Zetra Hall, Sarajevo. Same month she also performed at the National Theater in Belgrade, which saw polarizing reception from the general public and indignation from actors' union. In December 2016, Šerifović released "Deo prošlosti" under IDJTunes. A year later in November, she released the single "11". Šerifović again performed to a sold-out Belgrade Arena on 25 May 2018.

Between March and May of 2019, she embarked on a tour called Druga strana ploče, where she sang the covers of her favorite songs from other artists as well as her own hits. It featured seven sold out shows, six of which were held at Belgrade's Sava Centar and one in SPC Vojvodina, Novi Sad. The second rendition of the tour began a year later. It was supposed to include four live shows in Sava Centar, however, the last one was eventually cancelled due to COVID-19 pandemic. Same year, she also released her The Best of compilation under Dallas Records.

2021-present
During March 2022, Šerifović held five concerts in Banja Luka, Zagreb and Belgrade under the title Druga strana ploče Vol.3. The one in Zagreb was held to an audience of 10,000 people. In late December 2022, she released the single "Dobar Vam dan", which scored over million views in the first 24 hours.

Legacy of "Molitva"
In May 2007, Serbian magazine Nedeljnik highlighted that Šerifović focused her Eurovision performance on vocal delivery rather than on spectacle, which is often linked to Eurovision entries, citing her quote: "I like to hear music, not to watch it". Furthermore, the article compared her international success to those of tennis players Ana Ivanović, Jelena Janković and Novak Đoković.

In 2010, The Eurovision Times declared "Molitva" as the third best Eurovision entry of all time. Moreover, in 2016, Special Broadcasting Service ranked Šerifović among the top ten most deserving winners of the Eurovision. In 2019, "Molitva" was also placed at number ten on The Independent's listing of Eurovision winners.

DiscographyNaj, Najbolja (2003) Bez Ljubavi (2006) Nisam Anđeo (2008) Anđeo (2009) Hrabro'' (2014)

Filmography

Awards and nominations

See also
Music of Serbia
List of singers from Serbia
Serbia in the Eurovision Song Contest

References

External links

|-

|-

|-

1984 births
Living people
Musicians from Kragujevac
21st-century Serbian women singers
Serbian pop singers
Eurovision Song Contest winners
Eurovision Song Contest entrants for Serbia
Eurovision Song Contest entrants of 2007
Lesbian musicians
Serbian people of Romani descent
Megatrend University alumni
21st-century LGBT people
LGBT Romani people
Serbian LGBT singers
Beovizija contestants
Beovizija winners